Secret Location was a multi-Emmy and Cannes Lion Award winning content studio across web, mobile, tablet and platforms such as Virtual and Augmented Reality, based in Toronto and LA.

Background 
Launched in 2009 by Founders, James Milward, Ryan Andal and Pietro Gagliano, Secret Location had content studios in Canada and the US.

Secret Location staff have worked and collaborated with clients including: Samsung, Red Bull Canada, TELUS, Toyota, Cadbury, Air Canada, Mitsubishi, National Film Board of Canada, Stanfields, War Child, Focus Features, Fox Studios, NBC, Warner Bros., Disney XD, BET, PBS/Frontline, Nickelodeon/Teen Nick, Family Channel, CBC, MTV UK, YTV, CTV, TELETOON, City TV, Global TV, Showcase, OLN,  MGM, Endemol, Sony Pictures / Television, eOne, Shaftesbury Films, and Temple Street.

In 2014, eOne made an equity investment in the studio.
In 2016, eOne fully acquired Secret Location
In 2019, eOne and Secret Location were acquired by Hasbro
In 2022, it was announced that Hasbro would be closing Secret Location and merging some assets into the larger Hasbro organization

They have partnered with VRSE and LA talent agency UTA.

Awards 
The company is a two-time Emmy Winner. Secret Location won its first International Emmy for the interactive episode of the Canadian TV Series, Endgame. They won a Primetime Creative Arts Emmy Award in the category of User Experience and Visual Design for a tie-in to the drama series Sleepy Hollow. This marks the first time a virtual reality project has ever been awarded an Emmy.
The company is also a three-time Webby Award, 13-time Canadian Screen Award/Gemini, AToMiC, Creativity International, CASSIES, Marketing Awards, and Banff World Media festival winner.

References

External links 
 

Companies based in Toronto
Canadian companies established in 2008
Canadian companies disestablished in 2022
Entertainment companies of Canada
2016 mergers and acquisitions
Entertainment One